Packing is the process and/or the materials used in filling both service penetrations and building joints with backer materials as approved components within a firestop.

Purpose
Packing with inherently fire-resistive materials, such as rockwool or ceramic fibre is intended to protect sealants that would, on their own, be consumed by the fire. Lesser packing, such as foam backer rod or fibreglass are used simply to hold up materials that can survive fire testing on their own. In both cases, the packing is placed in such a way as to control the exact depth of the materials that top off the seal.

See also
 Firestop
 Mineral wool
 Annulus (firestop)
 Penetration (firestop)
 Fire test
 Passive fire protection
 Sealant
 Caulking
 Annulus (firestop)

External links
 Packing as used in a patented firestop product patent
 Ward Manufacturing UL Listing, Item 4A is Packing Material for Firestop

Passive fire protection
Firestops